The following outline is provided as an overview of and topical guide to nanotechnology:

Nanotechnology is science, engineering, and technology conducted at the nanoscale, which is about 1 to 100 nanometers.

Branches of nanotechnology 
 Green nanotechnology – use of nanotechnology to enhance the environmental-sustainability of processes currently producing negative externalities. It also refers to the use of the products of nanotechnology to enhance sustainability.
 Nanoengineering – practice of engineering on the nanoscale.

Multi-disciplinary fields that include nanotechnology 
 Nanobiotechnology – intersection of nanotechnology and biology.
 Ceramic engineering – science and technology of creating objects from inorganic, non-metallic materials.
 Materials science – interdisciplinary field applying the properties of matter to various areas of science and engineering. It investigates the relationship between the structure of materials at atomic or molecular scales and their macroscopic properties.
 Nanoarchitectonics – arranging nanoscale structural units, which are usually a group of atoms or molecules, in an intended configuration.
 Molecular engineering

Contributing fields

Nanoscience 
 Nanoelectronics – use of nanotechnology on electronic components, including transistors so small that inter-atomic interactions and quantum mechanical properties need to be studied extensively.
 Nanomechanics – branch of nanoscience studying fundamental mechanical (elastic, thermal and kinetic) properties of physical systems at the nanometer scale.
 Nanophotonics – study of the behavior of light on the nanometer scale.

Other contributing fields 
 Calculus
 Chemistry
 Computer science
 Engineering
 Miniaturization
 Physics
 Protein engineering
 Quantum mechanics
 Self-organization
 Science
 Supramolecular chemistry
 Tissue engineering
 Robotics
 medicine

Risks of nanotechnology 

Implications of nanotechnology
 Health impact of nanotechnology
 Environmental impact of nanotechnology
 Regulation of nanotechnology
 Societal impact of nanotechnology

Applications of nanotechnology 

 Energy applications of nanotechnology
 Quantum computing – computation using quantum mechanical phenomena, such as superposition and entanglement, to perform data operations.
 List of nanotechnology applications

Nanomaterials 

 Nanomaterials – field that studies materials with morphological features on the nanoscale, and especially those that have special properties stemming from their nanoscale dimensions.

Fullerenes and carbon forms 

Fullerene – any molecule composed entirely of carbon, in the form of a hollow sphere, ellipsoid, or tube. Fullerene spheres and tubes have applications in nanotechnology.
 Allotropes of carbon –
 Aggregated diamond nanorods –
 Buckypaper –
 Carbon nanofoam –
 Carbon nanotube –
 Nanoknot –
 Nanotube membrane –
 Fullerene chemistry –
 Bingel reaction –
 Endohedral hydrogen fullerene –
 Prato reaction –
 Endohedral fullerenes –
 Fullerite –
 Graphene –
 Graphene nanoribbon –
 Potential applications of carbon nanotubes –
 Timeline of carbon nanotubes –

Nanoparticles and colloids 

Nanoparticle –
 Ceramics processing –
 Colloid –
 Colloidal crystal –
 Diamondoids –
 Nanocomposite –
 Nanocrystal –
 Nanostructure –
 Nanocages –
 Nanocomposite –
 Nanofabrics –
 Nanofiber –
 Nanofoam –
 Nanoknot –
 Nanomesh –
 Nanopillar –
 Nanopin film –
 Nanoring –
 Nanorod –
 Nanoshell –
 Nanotube –
 Quantum dot –
 Quantum heterostructure –
 Sculptured thin film –

Nanomedicine 

Nanomedicine –
 Lab-on-a-chip –
 Nanobiotechnology –
 Nanosensor –
 Nanotoxicology –

Molecular self-assembly 

Molecular self-assembly – 
 DNA nanotechnology –
 DNA computing –
 DNA machine –
 DNA origami –
 Self-assembled monolayer –
 Supramolecular assembly –

Nanoelectronics 

Nanoelectronics –
 Break junction –
 Chemical vapor deposition –
 Microelectromechanical systems (MEMS)
 Nanocircuits –
 Nanocomputer –
 Nanoelectromechanical systems (NEMS)
 Surface micromachining –
 Nanoelectromechanical relays

Molecular electronics 

Molecular electronics –

Nanolithography 

Nanolithography –
 Electron beam lithography –
 Ion-beam sculpting –
 Nanoimprint lithography –
 Photolithography –
 Scanning probe lithography  –
 Molecular self-assembly  –
 IBM Millipede –

Molecular nanotechnology 

Molecular nanotechnology –
 Grey goo –
 Mechanosynthesis –
 Molecular assembler –
 Molecular modelling –
 Nanorobotics –
 Smartdust –
 Utility fog –
 Nanochondria –
 Programmable matter –
 Self reconfigurable –
 Self-replication –

Devices 
 Micromachinery –
 Nano-abacus –
 Nanomotor –
 Nanopore –
 Nanopore sequencing –
 Quantum point contact –
 Synthetic molecular motors –
 Carbon nanotube actuators –

Microscopes and other devices 

Microscopy –
 Atomic force microscope –
 Scanning tunneling microscope –
 Scanning probe microscope –
 Sarfus –

Notable organizations in nanotechnology 

List of nanotechnology organizations

Government 
 National Cancer Institute (US)
 National Institutes of Health (US)
 National Nanotechnology Initiative (US)
 Russian Nanotechnology Corporation (RU)
 Seventh Framework Programme (FP7) (EU)

Advocacy and information groups 
 American Chemistry Council (US)
 American Nano Society (US)
 Center for Responsible Nanotechnology (US)
 Foresight Institute (US)
 Project on Emerging Nanotechnologies (global)

Manufacturers 
 Cerion Nanomaterials, Metal / Metal Oxide / Ceramic Nanoparticles (US)
 OCSiAl, Carbon Nanotubes (Luxembourg)

Notable figures in nanotechnology 

 Phaedon Avouris - first electronic devices made out of carbon nanotubes
 Gerd Binnig - co-inventor of the scanning tunneling microscope
 Heinrich Rohrer - co-inventor of the scanning tunneling microscope
 Vicki Colvin Director for the Center for Biological and Environmental Nanotechnology, Rice University
 Eric Drexler - was the first to theorise about nanotechnology in depth and popularised the subject
 Richard Feynman - gave the first mention of some of the distinguishing concepts in a 1959 talk
 Robert Freitas - nanomedicine theorist
 Andre Geim - Discoverer of 2-D carbon film called graphene
 Sumio Iijima - discoverer of carbon nanotube
 Harry Kroto - co-discoverer of buckminsterfullerene
 Akhlesh Lakhtakia - conceptualized sculptured thin films
 Ralph Merkle - nanotechnology theorist
 Carlo Montemagno - inventor ATP nanobiomechanical motor (UCLA)
 Erwin Wilhelm Müller - invented the field ion microscope, and the atom probe
 Chris Phoenix - co-founder of the Center for Responsible Nanotechnology
Uri Sivan - set up and led the Russell Berrie Nanotechnology Research Institute at Technion in Israel 
 Richard Smalley - co-discoverer of buckminsterfullerene
 Norio Taniguchi - coined the term "nano-technology"
 Mike Treder - co-founder of the Center for Responsible Nanotechnology
 Joseph Wang - pioneer in electrochemical sensors exploiting nanostructured materials; synthetic nanomotors
 Alex Zettl - Built the first molecular motor based on carbon nanotubes
 Russell M. Taylor II - co-director of the UNC CISMM
 Adriano Cavalcanti - nanorobot expert working at CAN
 Lajos P. Balogh - editor in chief of Nanomedicine: NBM journal
 Charles M. Lieber - pioneer on nanoscale materials (Harvard)

See also 

 Catalyst
 Macromolecule
 Mesh networking
 Monolayer
 Nanometer
 Nanosub
 NBI Knowledgebase
 Photonic crystal
 Potential well
 Quantum confinement
 Quantum tunneling
 Self-assembly
 Self-organization
 Technological singularity

 Place these

 History of nanotechnology
 List of nanotechnology organizations
 Nanotechnology in fiction
 Outline of nanotechnology
 Impact of nanotechnology
 Nanomedicine
 Nanotoxicology
 Green nanotechnology
 Health and safety hazards of nanomaterials
 Regulation of nanotechnology
 Nanomaterials
 Fullerenes
 Carbon nanotubes
 Nanoparticles
 Molecular self-assembly
 Self-assembled monolayer
 Supramolecular assembly
 DNA nanotechnology
 Nanoelectronics
 Molecular scale electronics
 Nanolithography
 Nanometrology
 Atomic force microscopy
 Scanning tunneling microscope
 Electron microscope
 Super resolution microscopy
 Nanotribology
 Molecular nanotechnology
 Molecular assembler
 Nanorobotics
 Mechanosynthesis
 Molecular engineering

Further reading 
 Engines of Creation, by Eric Drexler
 Nanosystems, by Eric Drexler
 Nanotechnology: A Gentle Introduction to the Next Big Idea by Mark and Daniel Ratner, 
 There's Plenty of Room at the Bottom by Richard Feynman
 The challenges of nanotechnology by Claire Auplat

References

External links 

 NanoTechMap The online exhibition of nanotechnology featuring over 4000 registered companies
 
 What is Nanotechnology? (A Vega/BBC/OU Video Discussion).
 Course on Introduction to Nanotechnology
 Nanex Project
 SAFENANO  A nanotechnology initiative of the Institute of Occupational Medicine
 Glossary of Drug Nanotechnology

Nanotechnology
Nanotechnology